Troy Lane Birklett (born February 24, 1966), known professionally as Lil' Troy, is an American rapper and songwriter.

Early life
Birklett was born in Houston, Texas.

Career

Early career
In 1987, Birklett founded Short Stop and joined the group Mass 187 in 1987. Mass 187's song "Gangsta Strut" was featured on local radio. He eventually was convicted of conspiracy and served eighteen months in prison, at a Beaumont, Texas, federal detention center.

Wanna Be a Baller and later career
Lil' Troy, who featured in his songs many members of Houston's thriving rap scene of the late 1990s, managed to reach national audiences with his single "Wanna Be a Baller". The song reached No. 70 on the Billboard Hot 100, and propelled his Shortstop/Me & Mine Entertainment debut album, Sittin' Fat Down South, to the Top 25 albums on the Billboard 200. After the success of the lead single, Lil' Troy was picked up by Universal Music Group, which re-released his debut album in 1999 with a larger national distribution. The debut album was a success, as it certified Platinum by the RIAA selling 1.9 million copies in America. Lil' Troy released his follow up in 2001, titled Back to Ballin.  This album did not contain a charting single and did not fare nearly as well as his debut.  He released his third and to date last album, Paperwork, in 2006.

Discography

Albums

Singles

References

External links
Lil' Troy on YouTube

1966 births
Living people
African-American male rappers
American drug traffickers
Rappers from Houston
Underground rappers
Businesspeople from Texas
Place of birth missing (living people)
Universal Records artists
Southern hip hop musicians
Gangsta rappers
21st-century American rappers
21st-century American male musicians
21st-century African-American musicians
20th-century African-American people